The Luxembourg women's national rugby union team represents Luxembourg at rugby union. The side first played in 2007.

History

Results summary
(Full internationals only)

Results

Full internationals

Other matches

See also
 Luxembourg Rugby Federation
 Rugby union in Luxembourg
 Luxembourg national rugby union team
 Luxembourg national rugby sevens team

Clubs
 Rugby Club Luxembourg
 Rugby Club Walferdange

External links

Women's national rugby union teams
European national women's rugby union teams
Rugby union in Luxembourg
National team
Rugby union